Euonymus fimbriatus, also known as the fringed spindle tree, is a plant from the genus Euonymus. This tree comes from the Himalayas.

References

External links 
 http://en.hortipedia.com/wiki/Euonymus_fimbriatus
 

fimbriatus